The Order of the Lion of Bavaria was created in 1768 by Charles IV Theodore, Elector Palatine, to celebrate the 25th year of his reign.  Originally called the Order of the Palatine Lion (Orden vom Pfälzer Löwen), the Order was renamed when the Palatinate-Sulzbach branch of the Wittelsbach dynasty inherited the Duchy of Bavaria in 1778. The number of knights of the order are limited to 25, including the chancellor, or head of the order. Recipients of the order were originally required to have served the elector house for 25 years. In 1808, Maximilian I Joseph of Bavaria declared the order extinct and made no subsequent awards.

See also
Palatine Lion

References

1768 establishments in the Holy Roman Empire
Electoral Palatinate
Bavarian Lion
Culture of the Palatinate (region)